Chlamydastis illita is a moth of the family Depressariidae. It is found in Peru and Colombia.

The wingspan is about 14 mm. The forewings are white with an ochreous-grey patch occupying the basal third, extended as a costal band to three-fourths, a moderately broad suffused median fascia running into this, two undefined transverse shades beyond the cell, and a blotch extending along the termen. The second discal stigma is black and there is a marginal series of blackish dots around the apex and termen. The hindwings are grey.

References

Moths described in 1926
Chlamydastis